"Fever" is the fourth and final single from the Welsh heavy metal band Bullet for My Valentine's third album, Fever. It is the only single from the album that does not have a music video. It peaked at #23 on iLike Library's Most Added chart.

Personnel

Matthew "Matt" Tuck - lead vocals, rhythm guitar
Michael "Padge" Paget - lead guitar, backing vocals
Jason "Jay" James - bass guitar, backing vocals
Michael "Moose" Thomas - drums

Track listing

Charts

Critical reception 
The title track was met with favorable reviews. After describing Your Betrayal as having 'infantry intensity and then some wonderfully crisp riffing', BBC Raziq Rauf then claimed that "This approach is maintained throughout the rolling, pogo-friendly title-track".

References

2011 singles
Bullet for My Valentine songs
2009 songs
Jive Records singles
Songs written by Matthew Tuck
Songs written by Michael Paget
Songs written by Jason James (musician)
Songs written by Don Gilmore (record producer)
Music videos directed by Nigel Dick